Founded in 1910, the Dumb Friends League, based in Denver, Colorado, is the largest independent, nonprofit community-based animal shelter/humane society in the Rocky Mountain region, caring for thousands of pets annually and accepting lost and relinquished pets, as well as hundreds of equines.

The League provides lost and found services; foster and veterinary care for pets that are too young for adoption or are ill or injured; in-house training and socialization programs for cats, dogs and rabbits; pet adoptions; humane education; and animal cruelty investigations across Colorado. It also provides spay and neuter surgeries for cats and dogs at the Solutions – Spay/Neuter Clinic, and affordable veterinary care at the Solutions – Veterinary Hospital, for underserved metro-Denver communities.

The Dumb Friends League is a socially conscious animal welfare organization, which means they place 100% of healthy and safe pets. They also address the medical and behavioral needs of all animals while in their care. If an animal is suffering and cannot be helped, they will perform compassionate euthanasia.

Charity Navigator gives the Dumb Friends League a four-star rating, reporting high transparency and accountability. 

Every year the Dumb Friends League hosts the Furry Scurry, a walk to support homeless pets, its largest annual fundraiser.

The name 
The legal name is the Denver Dumb Friends League, also known as the Humane Society of Denver, Inc. It was incorporated September 8, 1910, by its founder, Mrs. Jean Gower, who wanted it modeled after a similar organization in London, England, called Our Dumb Friends League. In those days, the term dumb was widely used to refer to animals, because "they lacked the power of human speech." The London organization has since changed its name to Blue Cross, but the Denver organization has kept its original name because it is so widely recognized in the community and because the name reflects the mission of "speaking for those who cannot speak for themselves."

Facilities 
The Dumb Friends League has three shelters for companion animals and one for horses. Its main shelter and administrative offices are located at the Leslie A. Malone Center (formerly the Quebec Street Shelter) in Denver, the Buddy Center is in Castle Rock, and the Dumb Friends League San Luis Valley Animal Center is in Alamosa. The Dumb Friends League Harmony Equine Center in Franktown provides shelter, care, rehabilitation and adoption services for formerly abused and neglected horses, ponies, donkeys and mules. 

In addition to animal shelters, the Dumb Friends League operates the Solutions – Spay/Neuter Clinic and Solutions – Veterinary Hospital, both located in Denver. These facilities offer affordable spay/neuter and other veterinary services to pets whose owners cannot otherwise afford to provide this care.

References

External links 
 

Animal shelters in the United States
Animal welfare organizations based in the United States
Organizations established in 1910